The battle of Santa Lucia was an episode in the First Italian War of Independence.  On 6 May 1848, when the king of Sardinia, Carlo Alberto, sent I Corps of the Sardinian army to assault the fortified positions held before the walls of Verona by the Austrian army under field marshal Josef Radetzky.  The Austrian army, though outnumbered, managed to withstand the attack and hold their positions. The battle is named after the Santa Lucia district of Verona. Franz Joseph (then only 17 years old) assisted at the battle.

Context

Scope of hostilities

On 18 March 1848, revolt broke out in Milan.  The commander of the Lombard–Venetian army, field marshal Josef Radetzky, had excited the rebellion but did not know how to crush it and was forced to abandon the city of fierce fighting.  At the same time many other cities in Lombardy–Venetia and at Como the entire garrison went over to the insurgents. After the battle peace was restored to the region in 1849.

Battle of Pastrengo

Austrian strategic weakness

Radetzky's impasse

Assembled inside Verona there was still a considerable force, protected by valid fortifications: however, Austrian troops were demotivated after the first defeats (excepting the victory of 11 April over ill-equipped Lombard volunteers nearly Cortenuovo, followed by the killings of nearly 113 civilians).
In addition, the possibility of receiving help from General Nugent's troops through Isonzo was barricaded by the presence of Italian rebels in Palmanova, Osoppo and Venice.
To make Radetzky situation even worse, political situation after repression of Austrian Revolution led many observers to doubt about the field-marshal's capacity in maintaining order, and he was labeled as a conservative monarchist by public liberal opinion.

Advance
Advance begins on 6 May, hampered by Sardinians' little knowledge of territory, and only the central column reached enemy (while on right, Bava divisions lost contact with the rest of Sardinian army).

References

Santa Lucia
Santa Lucia
Santa Lucia
1848 in Italy
History of Verona
May 1848 events
Joseph Radetzky von Radetz